HMS Raider was the second of a class of sixty two  destroyers operated by the Royal Navy.  Launched in 1916, the vessel served with the Grand Fleet during World War I. The destroyer was built as part of the preceding  but was equipped with geared turbines which improved efficiency and increased range. The ship was involved in anti-submarine patrols, but did not sink any German submarines. After the war, the destroyer initially moved to Harwich and was briefly stationed in Ireland after the Irish Civil War. In 1923, the Navy decided to retire the older destroyers in the fleet and, although initially spared, Raider was decommissioned and sold to be broken up in 1927.

Design

Raider was originally ordered by the British Admiralty in May 1915 as part of the Sixth War Construction Programme as one of eighteen  destroyers. Instead, the ship was equipped, as had sister ship , with geared steam turbines and so became the second prototype for the R-class. The new engines proved to be more efficient, providing a greater range for a given quantity of fuel.

Three funnels were fitted.

Armament consisted of three single QF  Mk IV QF guns on the ship's centreline, with one on the forecastle, one aft on a raised platform and one between the central and aft funnels. A single QF 2-pounder  "pom-pom" anti-aircraft gun was carried, while torpedo armament consisted of two twin rotating mounts for  torpedoes. The ship had a complement of 82 officers and ratings.

Service
Raider was laid down by Swan Hunter & Wigham Richardson at Wallsend on the River Tyne in October 1915 and given the yard number 1007. The ship was launched on 17 July 1916 and completed in October. On commissioning, Raider joined the newly created Fifteenth Destroyer Flotilla of the Grand Fleet. The Flotilla took part in anti-submarine patrols east of the Shetland Islands during June 1917, but Raider was unsuccessful in sighting any enemy boats.

The vessel was part of the Fifteenth Destroyer Flotilla at the end of the war. After the Grand Fleet was disbanded, the ship was initially moved to reserve at Nore alongside over sixty other destroyers but then returned to service on 20 November 1919 based at Harwich. On 19 November 1920, Raider accompanied submarines of the H class to a service in memorial of the crew of the sunken , held over the place the boat had been last seen. The destroyer was briefly sent to Derry and Lough Swilly between 11 and 13 July 1923 at the end of the Irish Civil War. During that year, the Navy decided to scrap many of the older destroyers in preparation for the introduction of newer and larger vessels. Raider was initially spared, being refitted and transferred to the Portland Anti-Submarine Flotilla, arriving on 3 July 1925. Ships of the class were fitted with ASDIC and used to train crews in anti-submarine warfare. However, it was instead decided that Raider be scrapped. The destroyer was therefore sold to G Cohen on 29 April 1927 to be broken up at Grays.

Pennant numbers

References

Citations

Bibliography

 
 
 
 
 
 
 
 
 

1916 ships
R-class destroyers (1916)
Ships built by Swan Hunter
World War I destroyers of the United Kingdom